Aquatic Botany ("An International Scientific Journal dealing with Applied and Fundamental Research on Submerged, Floating and Emergent Plants in Marine and Freshwater Ecosystems") is a peer-reviewed scientific journal covering research on structure, function, dynamics, and classification of plant-dominated aquatic communities and ecosystems, as well as molecular, biochemical, and physiological aspects of aquatic plants. It publishes fundamental as well as applied research. The journal was established in 1975 by Cees den Hartog, who still serves as consulting editor. It is published by Elsevier and the editors-in-chief are E.M. Gross (University of Lorraine), Thomas Wernberg (University of Western Australia) and Brigitta van Tussenbroek (National Autonomous University of Mexico).

Abstracting and indexing
The journal is abstracted and indexed in Aquatic Sciences and Fisheries Abstracts, BIOSIS Previews, Current Contents/Agriculture, Biology & Environmental Sciences, EMBiology, and Scopus. According to the Journal Citation Reports, the journal has a 2020 impact factor of 2.473.

References

External links

Botany journals
Ecology journals
Aquatic plants
Elsevier academic journals
Publications established in 1975
English-language journals
Marine botany